Francesco Secchiari (born 24 August 1972 in Fivizzano) is a former Italian racing cyclist. He participated in 9 editions of the Giro d'Italia, 2 Tours de France, and 2 Vuelta a España.

Major results

1994
3rd Girobio
3rd Giro d'Abruzzo
1995
1st stage 3 Volta a Portugal
1997
1st Gran Premio Industria e Commercio Artigianato Carnaghese
1st stages 4 and 7 Volta a Portugal
1998
1st Giro di Toscana
1st Giro d'Abruzzo
1st stages 2 and 3 (TTT) 
2000
1st stage 9 Tour de Suisse

References

1972 births
Living people
Italian male cyclists
Sportspeople from the Province of Massa-Carrara
Cyclists from Tuscany
Tour de Suisse stage winners